George Nathan Seymour is an Australian politician currently serving as the Mayor of Fraser Coast Region in Queensland. Prior to his election to the mayoralty in a 2018 by-election, Seymour served as the Deputy mayor of Fraser Coast from 2013 to 2018, and the Councillor for Division 10 from 2012 to 2018. He also served as Acting Mayor between February and May 2018.

He was the Deputy Chairperson of the Queensland Heritage Council and has published books about Queensland history and architecture, including biographies of the writer Cecil Lowther (Bannerman) and the architect Philip Oliver Ellard Hawkes.

He has been on the national board of Regional Capitals Australia for a number of years, serving as treasurer and Queensland representative.

References

External links
official Youtube page
Fraser Coast Regional Council profile

Mayors of places in Queensland
Living people
University of the Sunshine Coast alumni
Queensland University of Technology alumni
Year of birth missing (living people)